Callistratus or Kallistratos may refer to:

 Callistratus of Aphidnae (died c. 350 BC), Athenian politician of the 4th century BC
 Callistratus (grammarian), Alexandrian writer of the 2nd century BC
 Callistratus (jurist), Roman legal writer active in the 3rd century AD
 Callistratus (sophist), Greek writer of the 3rd or 4th century AD
 Callistratus, an Athenian poet, known only as the author of a drinking song in honor of Harmodius and Aristogeiton (c. 500 BC)
 Callistratus, producer of some of Aristophanes' plays and his sometime collaborator
 , a historian of perhaps the 1st century BC, author of local histories of Heraclea Pontica and Samothrace
 Callistratus of Carthage, a Christian saint who is said to have inspired forty-nine soldiers to martyrdom in Carthage in the 4th century
 Callistratus of Georgia (1866–1952), catholicos-patriarch of All Georgia from 1932
 Callistratus, previous name of a Canadian research vessel, later renamed 
 Callistratus, the diabolical scientific vampire doctor character in the film Blood of the Vampire